Baduy people (sometimes spelled as Badui or Kanekes) are an indigenous Sundanese ethnic group native to the southeastern part of Banten, specifically Lebak Regency, in western Java, Indonesia.

Etymology
It is a native Sundanesic term that refers to an endemic vine plant of western Java, used as a herbal medicine since ancient times. As part of the Sundanesic family, baduyut is also bears the same meaning in Old Sundanese and Sundanese. It is likely that in ancient times, there was a river called Baduyut, as the term  itself literally means "Baduyut River" in the Sundanese language, and it is possible that this tribe was named after the river.

There is also a theory suggesting that the word baduy was initially an exonym used by outsiders to refer to these tribal groups, stemming from the idea that the Dutch equated them with Bedouin Arabs.

Sub-groups
The Baduy are divided into two sub-groups:
 Tangtu ( "Inner Baduy")
 Panamping ( "Outer Baduy")
No foreigners are allowed to meet the Inner Baduy, though the Outer Baduy do foster some limited contacts with the outside world.

Settlement area

The Baduy region is geographically located at 6°27’27" – 6°30’0" south and 108°3’9" – 106°4’55" east. The Baduy population of 11,700 is centered at the foothills of the Kendeng mountains at the Kanekes settlement, Leuwidamar district, Lebak Regency, Banten, a distance of 40 km from Rangkasbitung. This region, part of the Kendeng mountains, with an elevation of 300–500 meters (975'-1,625') above sea level, consists of hilly topography with surfaces that reach up to an average of 45% slope, with volcanic (in the north), precipitate (in the center), and mixed soil (in the south). The average temperature is 20 °C. The Baduy homeland in Java is contained in just  of hilly forest area,  from Jakarta, Indonesia's capital. The three main settlements of the Kanekes people are Cikeusik, Cikertawana, and Cibeo.

Language

The native language of the Baduy people, Baduy, belongs to the Sundanesic language family. Native speakers are dispersed in regions around the Mount Kendeng, Rangkasbitung district of Lebak Regency, Pandeglang Regency, and Sukabumi, West Java. It is estimated that there are 11,620 speakers as of 2010. In order to communicate with outsiders, the Baduy people tend to speak Sundanese and sometimes Indonesian to some degree of fluency. The Inner Baduy in Kanekes village are mostly illiterate, hence their customary, religious belief system and ancestral folk tales are preserved in a form of oral tradition.

Education
Formal education for Baduy children is seen by Baduy people as a violation of their traditional customs, and they have so far refused the Indonesian government's proposals to build educational facilities in their villages. As a result, few Baduy people are educated or able to read or write.

Origins

Mythology
According to their belief system, the Kanekes people regard themselves as descendants of Batara Cikal, one of seven deities, or gods, that was sent to Earth. This origin story is often associated with the biblical first man, Adam. According to the Kanekes, Adam and his descendants have been given the task to meditate or practice asceticism in order to preserve the harmony of the world.

History
The Kanekes origin story differs from the opinions of historians, who base their theories on the synthesis of historical evidence in the form of inscriptions, written records of Portuguese and Chinese sailors, as well as the 'Tatar Sunda' folklore, very little of which still remains. Some people believe that the Baduy are the descendants of the aristocracy of the Sunda Kingdom of Pajajaran, who lived near Batutulis, in the hills around Bogor, but there is no strong evidence to support this belief. The domestic architecture of that region follows most closely the traditional Sundanese architecture. Pakuwan Pajajaran port, known as Sunda Kelapa, was destroyed by invading Faletehan (Fatahillah) Muslim soldiers in 1579, and Dayeuh Pakuan, the capital of Pajajaran, was invaded by the Banten Sultanate some time later. Before the establishment of the sultanate, the western tip of Java island played an important role for the Sunda Kingdom, with Banten being a large trading port. Various types of vessels entered the Ciujung River, and most of them were used to transport crops that were harvested from the interior regions. Therefore, the ruler of the region, Prince Pucuk Umun, believed that the sustainability of the river needed to be maintained. An army of highly trained royal troops was commanded to guard and to manage the dense and hilly jungle areas in the region of Mount Kendeng. The troops, with their specific duties to that area, came largely from the Kanekes community, which still inhabits the upper part of Ciujung River at Gunung Kendeng.

The discrepancy between the two theories led to the notion that in the past, the identity and historicity of the Kanekes had been intentionally concealed, in order to protect the community from attacks by the Sunda Kingdom's enemies. Van Tricht, a doctor who had done medical research in the area in 1928, denied this theory, however. According to him, the Kanekes people are natives of the region and have strongly resisted external influences. The Kanekes people themselves also refuse to acknowledge that they originate from the fugitives of Pajajaran, the capital of the Kingdom of Sunda. According to Danasasmita and Djatisunda, the Baduy people are local to the settlements that are officially mandated by the king, because the people are obliged to preserve the kabuyutan (ancestral or ancestral worship).

Religion and beliefs

The religion of the Baduy is known as Agama Sunda Wiwitan and is rooted in ancestral worship and honoring or worshiping spirits of natural forces. According to the kokolot (elders) of Cikeusik village, Kanekes people are not adherents of Hinduism or Buddhism. However, in its development, this faith is influenced by and has incorporated elements of Hinduism, and to some extent, Islam.

The form of respect for the spirits of natural forces is carried out by guarding and preserving the natural environment, such as the mountains, hills, valleys, forests, gardens, springs, rivers, and all the ecosystems within them, as well as giving their highest gratitude to nature by treating and protecting the jungle as part of an effort to maintain the balance of the universe. The core of this belief is shown by the existence of pikukuh, or the absolute customary provisions practiced in the daily lives of the Kanekes people. The most important principle of the Kanekes people's pukukuh (adherence) is the concept of "no changes of whatsoever", or the slightest change possible: Lojor heunteu beunang dipotong, pèndèk heunteu beunang disambung (meaning "What's long cannot be cut [to shorten], and what's short cannot be attached [to lengthen]").

The Baduy also observe many mystical taboos. They are forbidden to kill, steal, lie, commit adultery, get drunk, eat food at night, take any form of conveyance, wear flowers or perfumes, accept gold or silver, touch money, or cut their hair. In agriculture, they practice pukukuh by not changing the contour of the land for their fields, so much so that the way of farming is very simple; not cultivating the land using plows or forming terraces, but only using hoe-farming methods, that is, with sharpened bamboo. In the construction of houses, the contouring of the soil surface is also left as is, therefore the poles of the Kanekes houses are often not of the same length. Words and actions of the Baduy people are expected to be honest, innocent, without beating around the bush, and devoid of bargaining in trade. Other taboos relate to defending Baduy lands against invasion: they may not grow sawah (wet rice), use fertilizers, raise cash crops, use modern tools for working ladang soil, or keep large domestic animals.

The most important religious object for the Kanekes people is the Arca Domas, whose location is kept secret and is considered sacred. The Kanekes people visit the site to worship once a year in the month of Kalima, which, in 2003, coincided with the month of July. Only Pu'un, or the highest customary chairman and several elected members of the community, will follow the entourage to worship. Rainwater is stored in a mortar container in the Arca Domas complex. If it is found to be clear at the time of worship, then it is a sign for the Kanekes people that there will be plenty of rain that year, and the harvest will be bountiful. Conversely, if the mortar container is dry, or the water is turbid, then it is a sign of crop failure.

A certain amount of Islamic influence has also penetrated into the religion of a few of the Baduy Luar in recent years (especially in Cicakal Girang village), with the addition of some original ideas. The ultimate authority is vested in Gusti Nu Maha Suci, who according to the Baduy sent Adam into the world to lead the life of a Baduy.

Social classes

The Kanekes people have a shared history and language with the Sundanese people. Some differences include their respective beliefs and lifestyles. The Kanekes people isolate themselves from the outside world and strictly preserve their traditional lifestyle, while the Sundanese are much more open to outside influences, and the majority of them embrace Islam.

Generally, the Baduy are divided into three groups, namely Tangtu, Panamping, and Dangka. The community of villages in which they live are called mandalas, derived from the Hindu/Buddhist concept but referring in the Indonesian context to places where religion is the central aspect of life.

The first group is Tangtu, or Kajeroan, also known as Baduy Dalam or Kanekes Dalam (meaning "Inner Kanekes"), with a population of about 400 consisting of forty families (Kajeroan) who live in the three villages of Cibeo, Cikertawana, and Cikeusik in Tanah Larangan (forbidden territory), where no stranger is permitted to spend the night. A characteristic of the Kanekes Dalam people is the color of their clothing—white and dark blue, as well as the wearing of a white headband. They follow the rigid buyut taboo system very strictly, (see § Religion and beliefs) and thus have made very little contact with the outside world. The priests of this community, known as pu'un, are the only ones allowed to visit the most sacred ground of the Baduy, which lies on Gunung Kendeng, in a place called Arca Domas. Unlike their Kanekes Luar counterparts, the Kanekes Dalam people are not influenced by Islam.

Some of the rules observed by the community include:
 No vehicles are allowed.
 No footwear is allowed.
 The door of the house should face north or south (except the house of the pu'un, or the customary chairman).
 Usage of electronic devices is prohibited.
 No modern clothing is allowed. Only hamd-woven black or white fabrics are allowed.

The Panamping, also known as Baduy Luar or Kanekes Luar (meaning "Outer Kanekes"), make up the remainder of the Baduy population, living in 22 villages and acting as a barrier to stop visitors from contacting the more reclusive community. They also follow the rigid taboo system but not as strictly as the Kanekes Dalam, and they are more willing to accept modern influences into their daily lives. For example, some Kanekes Luar wear the colorful sarongs and shirts favored by their Sundanese neighbors. In the past, the Baduy Luar only wore their homespun blue-black cloth and were forbidden to wear trousers. Other elements of civilization (toys, money, batteries) are rapidly infiltrating, especially in the villages to the north, and it is no longer unusual for an Outer Baduy person to make a journey to Jakarta or even to work outside as a hired hand during the rice planting and harvest seasons. Some even work in big towns and cities like Jakarta, Bogor, and Bandung. Meat is eaten in some of the outer villages, where dogs are trained for hunting, though animal husbandry is still forbidden.

Some Kanekes Dalam have become Kanekes Luar, either through intermarriage or as a result of breaking Kanekes Dalam customary laws.

Characteristics of the Kanekes Luar include:
 They are familiar with technology such as electronic devices.
 Construction of houses in the Kanekes Luar permits the use of modern tools, such as  saws, hammers, nails, etc.
 Wearing modern clothing like T-shirts and jeans is permitted.
 The use of modern home appliances, such as mattresses, pillows, plastic or glass plates and cups, etc, is allowed.
 A significant number have converted to Islam and been influenced by the outside world.

There are two Kanekes Luar settlements, namely Padawaras (Cibengkung) and Sirahdayeuh (Cihadam), which function as a buffer between the Kanekes Dalam and the outside world.

Governance

The Kanekes community recognizes two governing systems: the national system, which is in accordance with the laws of Indonesia, and the customary system, which abides by the customs of the community. Both are combined or acculturated in such a way that there is no conflict. Conventionally, the Kanekes people are led by a head of settlement, who is referred to as jaro pamarentah. Customarily, the Kanekes people fall under the leadership of the pu'un, who can be found in three settlements, or tangtu. The position is passed down through generations, but not necessarily from a father to his children; it can also be handed down to other relatives. The governing term of a pu'un is not specified; instead, it depends on a person's ability to hold on to the position.

Livelihood
As it has been the case for hundreds of years, the main livelihood of the Kanekes people is rice farming. Apart from that, they also earn extra income from selling the fruits they gather from the jungle, such as durian and tamarind-plum, as well as wild honey.

External interactions
The Kanekes community, who until the present have adhered strictly to their customs, has not been entirely isolated from the developments of the outside world. They became aware of the establishment of the Sultanate of Banten, which automatically annexed the Kanekes people into the kingdom's territory of power. As a sign of obedience to and recognition of these authorities, the Kanekes community routinely perform the seba ceremony each year, which involves delivering crops such as rice and fruit to the Governor of Banten (and formerly to the Governor of West Java) through the regent of Lebak. In agriculture, the Kanekes Luar people interact closely with outsiders in affairs such as leasing of land and laborers.

In the past, trading was done by barter, but nowadays, the community uses the national currency, the rupiah. The Kanekes people sell fruits, honey, and sugar palm through middlemen. They also purchase necessities that they do not produce themselves from markets.

Today, visitors to the Kanekes customary region are increasing, with a large number consisting of high school or college students. These are welcomed into the community and can even spend the night there, provided that they abide by local rules. These include a ban on taking pictures within the Kanekes Dalam areas as well as a prohibition on the use of soap or toothpaste in the rivers. The customary region of the Kanekes people remains forbidden to non-Indonesians, however, including journalists.

See also

 Agama Hindu Dharma
 Baduy Indigenous Ban
 Hyang
 Kejawèn
 Sunda Wiwitan

References

External links

 Wayang.net : Story of a Foreigner's Visit to the Baduy People
 TIMEasia.com | From Sapporo to Surabaya | Sacred People 
 Isolated Indonesian tribe immune to global crisis | Environment | Reuters
 "The Indonesian tribe that rejects technology", a short documentary by Al Jazeera

Ethnic groups in Indonesia
Sundanese culture
Hindu ethnic groups
Populated places in Banten
Hindu communities